Dimitrios Farantos (born 16 May 1966) is a Greek football manager.

References

1966 births
Living people
Sportspeople from Livadeia
Greek football managers
Levadiakos F.C. managers
Sportspeople from Central Greece